Paul Marciano (born ) is a French-born American fashion designer, businessman, investor, and philanthropist. He is the co-founder of Guess? Inc; his black-and-white advertisements have won numerous Clio awards. Initially run by all four Marciano brothers (Paul, Armand, Maurice and Georges), today the company and its extension lines, Marciano and G by Guess, are handled by Paul and Maurice. He is also a large benefactor to one of the larger Sephardic synagogues in Los Angeles, Em Habanim.

Early life
Paul Marciano was born around 1952 in Debdou, Morocco to a Jewish family and raised in Marseille, France with his four siblings, Georges, Armand, Maurice and Jacqueline. His father, grandfather, and great-grandfather were rabbis. They lived in an apartment in a synagogue complex. From ages 8–15, Paul, along with his brothers, was a member of the Éclaireurs israelites de France, a Jewish boy scout group which was located in the same complex. At 15, he and a friend were involved in a motorcycle accident when they collided with an oncoming car. After being told he would never walk again, he spent seven months in a wheelchair. He eventually regained full use of his limbs after a year and a half, but was not re-accepted into school due to his prolonged absence. Unable to finish his education, he traveled to Israel to live in a kibbutz.

Career

MGA
Marciano worked in his family's clothing company, MGA (which stood for Maurice Georges Armand), with shops in French Riviera. The Marciano brothers, Paul, Georges, Armand and Maurice, visited Southern California during an extended leave in 1977, and developed an appreciation for the area. After political changes in France in 1981 and the rise to power of socialist François Mitterrand, the Marcianos closed MGA and moved to the United States. They also ran an MGA on Little Santa Monica in Beverly Hills in the early 1980s. The brothers soon started the world-famous clothing company Guess.

Guess? Inc.

In 1981, the Marciano brothers founded Guess Jeans. In 1983, they sold a 50% stake in Guess Jeans to the Nakash Brothers (Joseph "Joe" Nakash, Abraham "Avi" Nakash, and Raphael "Ralph" Nakash) of New York. The joint venture soured and in 1989, a California superior court jury found that the Nakashes had fraudulently lured the Marcianos into the transaction. In 1990, the Nakash brothers settled for $66 million of $106 million escrowed profits and the ownership of the brand name "Gasoline" while the Marciano brothers received the brand "Diesel." Paul Marciano first handled advertising and public relations and later became president and chief operating officer of the company in 1993. In 2004, Paul and Maurice Marciano together owned close to 70 percent of the 44 million shares.

In June 2018, Paul Marciano stepped down as the CEO of Guess following allegations of sexual assault by Kate Upton and four other women which were settled for $500,000. Marciano had previously been accused of sexual harassment in 2008 and 2009, after model Lindsay Ring filed a suit that stated Marciano "began to create a hostile work environment for Ms. Ring by making sexual comments to her, repeatedly touching her inappropriately and without her consent, and attempting on at least two occasions to fondle her sexually after taking her to a private area at the worksite." He became Executive Chairman and remained Guess' chief creative officer.

Other business activities 
Along with his brother Maurice, Paul Marciano joined forces in 2013 with Steve Tisch and World Wrestling Entertainment in backing Hero Ventures, a Los Angeles entertainment start-up.

Philanthropy 
In 2013, the Maurice and Paul Marciano Art Foundation paid $8 million to buy the former Scottish Rite Masonic Temple on Wilshire Boulevard, which the two brothers plan to turn into a private museum designed by architect Kulapat Yantrasast. With  over four floors, it is almost as large as the Museum of Contemporary Art, Los Angeles and intended to house the Marcianos' 1,000-piece collection. In order to avoid any conflicts of interest with Maurice Marciano's subsequent co-chairmanship of MOCA, the project was temporarily put on hold. The museum opened in 2017. On 1 November 2019, A petition was filed with the National Labor Relations Board (NLRB) seeking to represent about 70 visitor services associates and other employees at the foundation, seeking a raise from the California minimum wage. On 7 November, all Visitor Services associates were laid off and the museum closed. Labor organizers then wrote to the NLRB, stating the foundation of "...illegally discriminated against its employees by laying off employees en masse and/or closing its facility."

In 2014, Paul and his brother Maurice donated $5.2 million to the Friends of the Israel Defense Forces.

Politics
Prior to 2016 Marciano donated primarily to Democratic political candidates. However, since 2016 he has stopped supporting Democrats and made over $20,000 in donations to Republican candidates including $2,700 (the maximum allowed by law) to Donald Trump.

Personal life
Marciano has been married twice. His first wife was model and photographer Kymberly Marciano; they had two children Nicolai (born 1996) and Ella (born 1994) before divorcing. In 2016, he married French model, Mareva Georges, Miss Tahiti 1990 and Miss France 1991, in Bora Bora. They have two children, Ryan (born 2005) and Gia (born 2012) and live in Los Angeles. Georges works as an advocate for the protection of children and women from abuse.

References

Bibliography

External links

Paul Marciano official website
Paul Marciano at the Fashion Model Directory
 Marciano Art Foundation Official Website
 Marciano Art Foundation Fan Website
 Wikiquote: Paul Marciano

American fashion businesspeople
American fashion designers
American company founders
American retail chief executives
1952 births
Date of birth missing (living people)
Living people
American investors
American Sephardic Jews
Businesspeople from Los Angeles
California people in fashion
French emigrants to the United States
French fashion designers
French investors
20th-century Moroccan Jews
Jewish American philanthropists
Jewish fashion designers
People from Beverly Hills, California
People from Debdou
Museum founders
Philanthropists from California
20th-century American businesspeople
20th-century French businesspeople
21st-century American businesspeople
21st-century American Jews